"Golden" is a song by English singer Harry Styles from his second studio album Fine Line (2019). The song was written by Styles alongside Mitch Rowland, Tyler Johnson and Kid Harpoon, with Johnson and Harpoon handling the production and co-production, respectively.
The song was serviced to contemporary hit radio formats in the United Kingdom on 23 October 2020 as the album's fifth single. In the US, the song was serviced to adult contemporary and contemporary hit radio formats on 26 and 27 October 2020 respectively. This song peaked at number 26 on the UK Singles Chart and at number 57 on the US Billboard Hot 100.

Composition
"Golden" is an indie pop and soft rock song, with a 1970s and Southern California sound. The song is composed in  time and the key of D major, with a moderately fast tempo of 140 beats per minute and a chord progression of C–Em/Bm7–D. It incorporates clusters of background harmonies and is filled with twinkling glockenspiel tinkles. Styles' vocals range from D3 to B4.

Music video
The music video for "Golden" was directed by Ben Turner and Gabe Turner, and premiered on 26 October 2020. In the music video, Styles is shown running, swimming, and driving a car along the Amalfi Coast in Italy.

Accolades

Credits and personnel
Credits adapted from the liner notes of Fine Line.

Recording
 Recorded at Real World Studios (Bath, Somerset), Shangri-La (Malibu, California), Groove Masters (Santa Monica, California), and Harpoon House (Los Angeles, California)
 Mixed at EastWest Studios (Los Angeles, California)
 Mastered at Sterling Sound (Edgewater, New Jersey)

Personnel
 Harry Styles vocals, backing vocals, songwriting
 Tyler Johnson production, songwriting, backing vocals, keyboards
 Kid Harpoon co-production, songwriting, backing vocals, synth moog bass, acoustic guitar
 Mitch Rowland songwriting, drums, slide guitar, glockenspiel, electric guitar
 Leo Abrahams electric guitar
 Sammy Witte engineering
 Jon Castelli additional engineering
 Mark Rankin additional engineering
 Nick Lobel additional engineering
 Dylan Neustadter assistant engineering
 Jeremy Hatcher assistant engineering
 Kevin Smith assistant engineering
 Oli Jacobs assistant engineering
 Oliver Middleton assistant engineering
 Rob Bisel assistant engineering
 Tyler Beans assistant engineering
 Spike Stent mixing
 Michael Freeman mix assistant
 Randy Merrill mastering

Charts

Weekly charts

Monthly charts

Year-end charts

Certifications

Release history

Notes

References

2019 songs
2020 singles
Columbia Records singles
Harry Styles songs
British indie pop songs
Songs written by Harry Styles
Songs written by Tyler Johnson (musician)
Songs written by Kid Harpoon
Music videos shot in Italy